Hussein Moukhtar (10 January 1905 – April 1966) was an Egyptian weightlifter. He competed at the 1928 Summer Olympics and the 1936 Summer Olympics.

References

1905 births
1966 deaths
Egyptian male weightlifters
Olympic weightlifters of Egypt
Weightlifters at the 1928 Summer Olympics
Weightlifters at the 1936 Summer Olympics
People from Damietta Governorate
20th-century Egyptian people